Silicon Docks is a 2022 animated feature film from Irish director Graham Jones portraying a group of American tech moguls on a failed Dublin pub crawl during the international pandemic.

References

External links

Graham Jones Official Website